Soğanverdilər (also, Soganverdilar and Subkhanverdilar) is a village and municipality in the Barda Rayon of Azerbaijan.  It has a population of 1,487.

References

Populated places in Barda District